Fayez Zaghloul (born 8 August 1959) is a Syrian boxer. He competed in the men's bantamweight event at the 1980 Summer Olympics.

References

1959 births
Living people
Syrian male boxers
Olympic boxers of Syria
Boxers at the 1980 Summer Olympics
Place of birth missing (living people)
Bantamweight boxers
20th-century Syrian people